Edivaldo is a Portuguese given name. It may refer to:

 Edivaldo Alves de Santa Rosa (1934–2002) Brazilian footballer commonly known as Dida
 Edivaldo Martins Fonseca (1962–1993), Brazilian footballer
 Edivaldo Monteiro (born 1976), Portuguese athlete, competitor at the 2004 Summer Olympics
 Edivaldo Medeiros da Silva (born 1974), Brazilian footballer
 Edivaldo Hermoza (born 1985), Brazilian–Bolivian footballer

See also
 Edvaldo (disambiguation)

Portuguese masculine given names